Cooper Street Historic District is a historic district located in Camden, Camden County, New Jersey, United States. The district goes from 2nd Street to 7th Street along Cooper Street and was added to the National Register of Historic Places on August 7, 1989.

See also
National Register of Historic Places listings in Camden County, New Jersey

References

External links
Living Places Cooper Street Historic District

Historic districts in Camden County, New Jersey
Houses on the National Register of Historic Places in New Jersey
Federal architecture in New Jersey
Camden, New Jersey
National Register of Historic Places in Camden County, New Jersey
Houses in Camden County, New Jersey
Historic districts on the National Register of Historic Places in New Jersey
New Jersey Register of Historic Places